William Pitt Angel (February 2, 1813 in Cooperstown, Otsego County, New York – February 8, 1869) was an American lawyer and politician from New York.

Life
He was the son of William G. Angel and Emily P. (English) Angel (1790–1822). He practiced law at Olean. He was District Attorney of Cattaraugus County from 1845 to 1850 and from 1857 to 1859.

In 1848, he ran on the Barnburners/Free Soil ticket for Inspector of State Prisons, but was defeated by Whig Alexander H. Wells. In 1850, he ran again, this time on the Democratic and Anti-Rent tickets, and was elected, being in office from 1851 to 1853. On February 20, 1851, he married Laura Eliza Bigelow (1826–1872).

He was a member of the New York State Assembly (Cattaraugus Co., 1st D.) in 1865. Afterwards he removed to Morrisania, then in Westchester County, and practiced law there. In 1868 he formed a partnership with his brother James R. Angel (1836–1899) but died the next year.

New York State Senator Wilkes Angel (1817–1889) and Texas Angel (1839–1903, a lawyer in Hailey, Idaho, and a Populist contender for U.S. Senator from Idaho in 1897) were also his brothers.

Sources
The New York Civil List compiled by Franklin Benjamin Hough (pages 45 and 370; Weed, Parsons and Co., 1858)
The New York Civil List compiled by Franklin Benjamin Hough, Stephen C. Hutchins and Edgar Albert Werner (1867; pages 411, 501 and 507)
Angel genealogy at Gen Forum
History and Genealogy of the Pomeroy Family by Albert Alonzo Pomeroy (page 609)

1813 births
1869 deaths
People from Olean, New York
People from Cooperstown, New York
New York State Prison Inspectors
County district attorneys in New York (state)
Democratic Party members of the New York State Assembly
New York (state) Free Soilers